The August 1st or Ba Yi Aerobatics Team is the aerobatic demonstration team of the People's Liberation Army Air Force (PLAAF). It was founded in 1962 and named after the date of founding of the People's Liberation Army (PLA), August 1, 1927.

History 
It is named after the date of the founding of the PLA (August 1, 1927), and is a part of the PLAAF Beijing Military Region. The unit was founded in 1962 and has over the years performed more than 500 times for delegations from 166 countries and regions. Its first show abroad happened in August 2013 during the Russian airshow MAKS.

Aircraft
The August 1st aerobatic team (Ba Yi aerobatic team) initially equipped the fleet with JJ-5 fighter-trainer jets, a Chinese version of Russian made MiG-17. In later years the JJ-5s were replaced by Chengdu J-7EB, then again was replaced by the newer J-7GB (2001). There are about 8 aircraft in the fleet, but only 6 are set for any airshow.

In May 2009, the team upgraded their jets to the much more advanced Chengdu J-10 multirole fighter.

Base
 The aerobatics team is based out of Yangcun Air Force Base (Meichong) near Tianjin, home to the 24th Fighter Division.

Appearances

China International Aviation & Aerospace Exhibition
MAKS 2013
Dubai Air Show 2017
Joint Pakistan Air Force and PLAAF Airshow at PAF Base Samungli in 2017
2019 Pakistan Day Parade
Singapore Airshow 2020

Accidents
 June 1997 – 3 aircraft crashed in Tianjin during a practice session.
 15 September 1998 – single aircraft crashed near Chongming Island Airport near Shanghai.
 July 14, 2009 – Number 3 wing which was a J-7GB crashed at Yang Cun airbase during practicing session, while preparing for the coming National Day demonstration on October 1st.
 12 November 2016 – Captain Yu Xu, first female J-10 pilot, was killed in an accident during training in Hebei province.

References

External links
http://www.airliners.net/open.file/914320/M/
Squadron patch

People's Liberation Army Air Force
Aerobatic teams
Military units and formations established in 1962
Chinese ceremonial units